Got the Magic is the first studio by Celtic Harp Orchestra, released by Ethnoworld in 2003.

Tracks
 An Analarc'h
 Morrison Jig
 With this Love
 Brian Boru's March
 Suil a Ruin
 The Shrine
 Children of Llyr
 Miss Mc Dermot
 Me, You & Bathroom
 Mon
 Let It Wait
 Morrison Jig(alt. take)
 She Once Smiled

Musicians
Fabius Constable: Director, Harp

Donatella Bortone: Soprano

Sabrina Noseda: Harp
Chiara Vincenzi: Harp
Pauline Fazzioli: Harp
Ludwig Constable: Harp
Antonella d'Apote: Harp
Rossana Monico: Harp
Maria Assunta Romeo: Harp
Patrizia Borromeo: Harp
Adriano Sangineto: Harp
Caterina Sangineto: Harp
Alaits Andonegi: Harp
Azzurra Giudici: Harp
Elena Sambin: Harp
Gabriella Villa: Harp
Antonio Callea: Harp, Flute
Nicolò Righi: Harp
Maria Fraschini: Harp
Marzia Leccese: Harp
Francesco Accardo: Harp
Laura Scarpelli: Harp
Elisa Nicotra: Harp
Matteo Barni: Harp
Daniela Calò: Harp
Myriam Peverelli: Harp
Sarah Barni: Harp
Mirella Giuliani: Harp
Daniela Mancini: Harp
Donatella Ingesti: Harp
Laura Mainardi: Harp
Elisa Esposto: Harp
Giancarlo Rabericati: Harp
Ilenia Vietri: Harp
Elvezia Degli Esposti: Harp

Massimo Cerra: Oboe

Daniele Bicego: Uilleann pipes

Maurizio Berti: Percussion
Valerio Meletti: Percussion

Marco Carenzio: Guitar

Celtic Harp Orchestra albums
2003 albums